San Jose is a census-designated place in Rio Arriba County, New Mexico, United States. Its population was 695 as of the 2010 census. U.S. routes 84 and 285 pass through the community.

Geography

Education
It is in Española Public Schools. The comprehensive public high school is Española Valley High School.

References

Census-designated places in New Mexico
Census-designated places in Rio Arriba County, New Mexico